Hans Ernst Homberger (31 October 1908 - 26 January 1986) was a Swiss rower who competed with two of his brothers. He won two medals at the 1935 European Rowing Championships and a further two medals at the 1936 Summer Olympics. Born into a family of industrialists, he took over the International Watch Company when his father died in 1955. He led the company until he sold it to VDO in 1978.

Family
Homberger was born in 1908 in Schaffhausen, Switzerland. Two of his younger brothers, Rudolf Homberger (born 1910) and Alex Homberger (born 1912), were also competitive rowers. Their father was Ernst Homberger who headed the Georg Fischer company since 1902, and who later became the head of the International Watch Company.

Rowing career
At the 1935 European Rowing Championships in Berlin, Homberger won gold with the coxless four; his brother Alexander was part of the crew. At the same event, all three brothers competed with the men's eight and came second.

In 1936 he was a crew member of the Swiss boat which won the silver medal in the coxed four event. As part of the Swiss boat in the coxless four competition he won the bronze medal. He also participated in the eight event where the Swiss boat finished sixth. Whilst the Swiss had been the favourites for the men's eight event, four of them had already competed in the coxed four and coxless four events that day (including both Hans and Alex Homberger) and they were exhausted when the final for the eight was raced.

Professional career
When his father died in 1955, Homberger took over as managing director of the International Watch Company. He led the company until 1978 when it was sold to VDO.

Homberger died in 1986.

References

1908 births
1986 deaths
Swiss male rowers
Olympic rowers of Switzerland
Rowers at the 1936 Summer Olympics
Olympic silver medalists for Switzerland
Olympic bronze medalists for Switzerland
Olympic medalists in rowing
Medalists at the 1936 Summer Olympics
Swiss watchmakers (people)
People from Schaffhausen
Sportspeople from the canton of Schaffhausen
European Rowing Championships medalists